Brigadier General John Robinson Royston,  (29 April 1860 – 25 April 1942) was a South African-born military officer who commanded a brigade of Australian Light Horse during the First World War.

A farmer and citizen soldier, during the late 1870s and early 1880s, Royston served in the Natal Mounted Rifles as an enlisted soldier and fought during the Zulu War. During the Second Boer War he was commissioned in the Imperial Light Horse, and fought at the Siege of Ladysmith, before later commanding a contingent of the Western Australian Mounted Infantry. He was appointed a Companion of the Distinguished Service Order (DSO) for his service during the war, and received the decoration from the Prince of Wales during a large coronation parade of colonial troops in London on 1 July 1902. After the end of the war, he was made a Companion of the Order of St Michael and St George (CMG) in the October 1902 South African Honours list.

Later he served during the Zulu Rebellion before organising the Natal Light Horse—made up primarily of Australians who had remained in Africa after the Boer War—upon the outbreak of the First World War. After seeing action against the Germans in South-West Africa, Royston was transferred to Egypt and placed in command of the 12th Light Horse Regiment, commanding them through the Battle of Romani in 1916. He was later promoted to command the 2nd Light Horse Brigade temporarily, before taking command of the 3rd Light Horse Brigade, and leading them in the Sinai and Palestine campaign against the Ottoman Empire until October 1917 when he returned to South Africa having been relieved of his command due to medical reasons.

References

Further reading
 
 

1860 births
1942 deaths
Australian generals
Australian military personnel of World War I
Companions of the Distinguished Service Order
Companions of the Order of St Michael and St George
South African generals